Stanwood High School is a public high school located in the city of Stanwood, Washington about  north of Seattle. There are 1,285 students between the 9th and 12th grades at Stanwood High School's  campus.

Athletics 
In athletics, Stanwood competes in the 3A competition level in the state of Washington. Teams participate in the WesCo athletic conference. The school nickname is the Spartans and the official colors are red, grey, and white. At a playoff football game on November 4th, 2022, against Lakes High School, Stanwood students and players repeatedly subjected Lakes High players and cheerleaders to racist taunts and epithets.

Building 
The high school opened in 1971, replacing the older Twin City High School, and was originally built with a "California-style" campus requiring access from the outside. Renovations in 1980, 1993, and 2001 have expanded the high school, but overcrowding had forced the use of portable classrooms in recent years.

In 2017, a $147.5 million bond was approved for the construction of a new, three-story school building to replace the old one. Construction of the new building began in 2018 and lasted until early 2021.

Notable students
 T. J. Oshie, right wing for the Washington Capitals  and USA Olympian

References

External links 
Stanwood High School website

High schools in Snohomish County, Washington
Public high schools in Washington (state)